Ilino  is a village in the municipality of Boljevac in eastern Serbia. According to the 2011 census, the village has a population of 105 people.

References

Populated places in Zaječar District